Josef Aigner (born 19 June 1959) is a former international speedway rider from West Germany.

Speedway career 
Aigner was a champion of West Germany, winning the West German Championship in 1982.

He has also reached the final of the Individual Speedway Long Track World Championship on four occasions in 1980, 1981, 1982 and 1984. He won a bronze medal in the 1980 final.

World final appearances

World Longtrack Championship
 1980 –  Scheeßel 3rd 16pts
 1981 –  Gornja Radgona 7th 13pts
 1982 –  Esbjerg 15th 4pts
 1984 –  Herxheim 14th 5pts

References 

Living people
1959 births
German speedway riders
People from Fürstenfeldbruck (district)
Sportspeople from Upper Bavaria